Wilfred Reilly is an American political scientist. He is an Associate Professor of Political Science at Kentucky State University. He holds a Ph.D. in Political Science from Southern Illinois University and a J.D. degree from the University of Illinois College of Law. Reilly's research focuses on empirical testing of political claims.

Work

Hate Crime Hoax 
Reilly's book Hate Crime Hoax: How the Left is Selling a Fake Race War was published by Regnery Publishing in February 2019. For the book, Reilly assembled a data set of 409 allegedly false or dubious hate crime allegations (concentrated during the past five years), which he describes as hoaxes on the basis of reports in mainstream national or regional news sources. Reilly has stated this data set is available to anyone who requests it. He uses this data to support his claim that a substantial percentage of all hate crime allegations must be hoaxes, given that, per his analysis, only about 7,000 reported hate crimes take place in a typical year, and at most 8–10% of these receive the national or regional reporting that is required for inclusion in his data set. In the wake of the Jussie Smollett hate crime hoax, Reilly authored an editorial outlining his case in USA Today. After interviewing Reilly, the Washington Post argued that hate crimes are on the rise and a relatively small percentage of allegations are hoaxes, but quoted him as saying "It’s politicization to say there’s a massive surge of hate" under President Donald Trump and that political liberals tend to characterize all hate crimes as "attacks on innocent people of color" when "you don't know what happened".

Reilly argues that many or most recent high-profile hate crimes (e.g. Jussie Smollett, Yasmin Seweid) have turned out to be hoaxes.

Other work 
On April 21, 2016, Reilly participated in a regionally televised debate against alt-right personality Jared Taylor. Reilly argued for the social value of diversity, contending that it makes life "more interesting, civilized, and fun," and using published research to point out that mono-racial societies (e.g. Bosnia, Somalia) are often no more peaceful or less conflicted than multi-racial societies, due to the greater prevalence of tribal in-fighting within them. Taylor took the anti-diversity position.

Reilly's PhD dissertation, submitted in 2015, was titled The Effect of Racial Status and Other Core Characteristics on Collective Self-Esteem: A Quantitative Test of Divergent Theories of Identity Valuation. In 2019, he published a summary of his dissertation in Commentary magazine.

In January 2020, Reilly published Taboo, a book in which he argues that certain race, gender, and class issues can no longer be discussed in mainstream American society.

Views 
In 2016, Reilly criticized then-candidate Donald Trump for allegedly dog-whistling to the alt-right, and described the 2016 United States presidential campaign as "shining light on some dark corners of the Internet.".

References 

Living people
21st-century American non-fiction writers
African-American political scientists
American social scientists
American male non-fiction writers
American political commentators
Year of birth missing (living people)
21st-century American male writers
21st-century African-American writers
Kentucky State University faculty